gDesklets is a GNOME program which provides the architecture for small applets (desktop widgets) to be placed on top of the user's desktop.  It is comparable to other desktop widget programs.  The applets placed on the desktop are meant to be quick ways for the user to retrieve information and not get in the way of normal activity.

Desklets 
The small programs that run inside gDesklets are called desklets and are small Python applets loaded into the gDesklets daemon. There are many gDesklets available from the gDesklets home page. Some of them include:
 Clocks
 Calendars
 Docking
 Weather
 RSS feed aggregators
 Controls for other applications (such as XMMS and Pidgin)
 Animated toolbars
 Desktop notes
 System monitors

See also 

 Screenlets

References

External links

GNOME Applications
GNOME
Widget engines